Caribbean Airlines Flight 523 was a passenger flight that overran the runway at Cheddi Jagan International Airport, Georgetown, Guyana, on 30 July 2011. Seven of the 163 aboard suffered injuries. The aircraft involved, a Boeing 737-800, was operating Caribbean Airlines' scheduled international service from John F. Kennedy Airport, New York, to Georgetown.

Accident
The aircraft failed to stop in rainy weather, overrunning the runway at 01:32 local time (05:32 UTC), crashing through the perimeter fence. The aircraft stopped  past the end of runway 06 after it went over a road and broke into two sections.

There were 157 passengers and 6 crew on the aircraft. No deaths were reported directly following the incident. Two passengers suffered broken legs. The majority of the injured were treated at Diamond Diagnostic Hospital then sent onto Georgetown Public Hospital, where 35 passengers were treated for leg, back and neck injuries. The aircraft was damaged beyond repair in the accident. The accident represents the ninth hull loss of a Boeing 737-800.

Trinidad and Tobago's Prime Minister Kamla Persad-Bissessar flew to Guyana to assess the situation, because the government of Trinidad and Tobago owns Caribbean Airlines. Guyana's emergency response team appeared at the accident scene two hours after the incident.  Further officials from the Trinidad and Tobago Civil Aviation Authority (TTCAA) and U.S. National Transportation Safety Board (NTSB) were invited to Guyana to aid in investigations. The Guyana Civil Aviation Authority (GCAA) will head the technical investigation, with assistance from the NTSB and the TTCAA.

Investigation
The Government Information Agency (GINA) Guyana reported the probable cause to be pilot error, stating: "The cause of the accident was the aircraft touching down far beyond the touchdown zone due to the captain maintaining excess power during the flare and not using the airplane's full deceleration capacity, resulting in the aircraft over running the pavement and fracturing the fuselage."

See also
 Fly Jamaica Airways Flight 256
 Air India Express Flight 812, another Boeing 737-800 that suffered a runway excursion due to pilot error, with fatalities.
 American Airlines Flight 331, also experienced a runway excursion due to inclement weather and pilot error.

References

External links
 Caribbean Airlines notification, 1 August 2011.
 Caribbean Airlines service announcement, 2 September 2011
 Final report, Guyana Civil Aviation Authority

Accidents and incidents involving the Boeing 737 Next Generation
Aviation accidents and incidents in 2011
2011 in Guyana
Airliner accidents and incidents involving runway overruns
Airliner accidents and incidents caused by pilot error
Aviation accidents and incidents in Guyana
Caribbean Airlines
July 2011 events in South America